The fourth and final season of the American superhero streaming television series Titans premiered on HBO Max on November 3, 2022, and will consist of 12 episodes. It was executive produced by Akiva Goldsman, Geoff Johns, Greg Walker, Greg Berlanti, Sarah Schechter, and Richard Hatem, with Walker serving as showrunner for the fourth consecutive season. Developed by Goldsman, Johns, and Berlanti, the series is based on the DC Comics team Teen Titans. Brenton Thwaites, Anna Diop, Teagan Croft, Ryan Potter, and Joshua Orpin return to the main cast from the previous season, joined by season three guest star Jay Lycurgo and series newcomers Franka Potente and Joseph Morgan.

Episodes

The eighth through twelfth episodes were written by Melissa Brides, Tom Pabst, Bryan Edward Hill, Jamie Gorenberg, and Richard Hatem respectively.

Cast and characters

Main
 Brenton Thwaites as Dick Grayson / Nightwing
 Anna Diop as Koriand'r / Kory Anders / Starfire
 Teagan Croft as Rachel Roth / Raven
 Ryan Potter as Gar Logan / Beast Boy
 Joshua Orpin as Conner Kent / Superboy
 Jay Lycurgo as Tim Drake
 Franka Potente as May Bennett / Mother Mayhem
 Joseph Morgan as Sebastian Sanger / Brother Blood
 Charlie Zeltzer as young Sebastian
 Devin Ross as teen Sebastian

Recurring

 James Scully as Bernard Fitzmartin
 Lisa Ambalavanar as Jinx

Guest
 Titus Welliver as Lex Luthor
 Kyana Teresa as Dr. Espenson
 Emma Ho as Aria Murphy
 Nicola Correia-Damude as Gina
 Somkele Iyamah-Idhalama as Zadira
 Noah Dalton Danby as Confessor
 Reed Birney as Dr. Adamson
 Nyambi Nyambi as Mysterious Person
 Tim Post as Arthur Holmwood / Raven Mask
 Valerie Boyle as Sandra Sanger
 Diane Chrisman as young Sandra Sanger
 Jonelle Gunderson as Lironne
 Deneisha Henry as Lila
 Ziyanda Moyo as young Lila
 Daniel Brière as Mr. Ross

An uncredited stunt double portrays Slade Wilson / Deathstroke.

Production

Development
The fourth season was announced at DC FanDome in October 2021. In January 2023, it was reported that the series is to end with the fourth season.

Casting
Series regulars Brenton Thwaites, Anna Diop, Teagan Croft, Ryan Potter, and Joshua Orpin return from the previous season. Jay Lycurgo who was recurring in season three was added to the main cast. Former main cast members Conor Leslie, Minka Kelly, Alan Ritchson, Curran Walters, Damaris Lewis, Savannah Welch and Vincent Kartheiser do not return. In January 2022, Joseph Morgan, Franka Potente, and Lisa Ambalavanar were announced as season four villains Brother Blood, Mother Mayhem, and Jinx, respectively. Titus Welliver was revealed to be playing Lex Luthor in September 2022.

Filming
Filming for the fourth season began on February 28, 2022, and concluded on September 30, 2022.

Release
The fourth season premiered on November 3, 2022. It will be split into two parts of six episodes for a total of 12 episodes.

References

External links 
 
 

Titans (2018 TV series) seasons
2022 American television seasons